Zhou Qiming (born 24 July 1994) is a Chinese professional football player as a defender for Quanzhou Yassin.

Club career
Zhou Qiming started his professional footballer career with Chinese Super League side Tianjin Teda in 2013. He would eventually make his league debut for Tianjin Teda on 28 September 2014 in a game against Henan Jianye. He played for the reserved team in 2015 and 2016 league season.

Career statistics 
Statistics accurate as of match played 31 December 2020.

References

External links
 

1994 births
Living people
Chinese footballers
Sportspeople from Chengdu
Footballers from Sichuan
Tianjin Jinmen Tiger F.C. players
Chinese Super League players
Association football midfielders